The Vàm Cỏ River (sông Vàm Cỏ) is a river in Vietnam, south of Ho Chi Minh City. It joins the Soài Rạp in the Cần Giờ Mangrove Forest and is fed by two shallow tributaries, the Vàm Cỏ Tây (west) and Vàm Cỏ Đông (east) forming a V.

References

Rivers of Ho Chi Minh City
Rivers of Vietnam